The 2015 SAFF Championship Final was a football match that took place on 3 January 2016 at the Trivandrum International Stadium in Thiruvananthapuram, India, to determine the 2015 SAFF Championship champion.

Venue
On 2 July 2015, it was announced that the matches during the tournament, including the final, would take place at the newly constructed Trivandrum International Stadium in Thiruvananthapuram, Kerala.

Route to the final

Match

Match rules
90 minutes.
30 minutes of extra-time if necessary.
Penalty shoot-out if scores still level.
Eight named substitutes.
Maximum of three substitutions.

See also
 2015 SAFF Championship

References

External links 

 SAFF Official website

2015 SAFF Championship
Champions League Final
India national football team matches
Afghanistan national football team matches
SAFF Championship Finals
January 2016 sports events in Asia